Common ragwort is a common name for several plants and may refer to:

Jacobaea vulgaris, native to northern Eurasia
Pericallis × hybrida